
Gmina Ciechanowiec is an urban-rural gmina (administrative district) in Wysokie Mazowieckie County, Podlaskie Voivodeship, in north-eastern Poland.

Villages
Apart from the town of Ciechanowiec, Gmina Ciechanowiec contains the villages and settlements of Antonin, Bujenka, Ciechanowczyk, Czaje-Bagno, Czaje-Wólka, Dąbczyn, Kobusy, Koce-Basie, Koce-Piskuły, Koce-Schaby, Kosiorki, Kostuszyn-Kolonia, Kozarze, Kułaki, Łempice, Malec, Nowodwory, Pobikry, Przybyszyn, Radziszewo Stare, Radziszewo-Króle, Radziszewo-Sieńczuch, Skórzec, Trzaski, Tworkowice, Winna-Chroły, Winna-Poświętna, Winna-Wypychy, Wojtkowice Stare, Wojtkowice-Dady, Wojtkowice-Glinna and Zadobrze.

Neighbouring gminas
Gmina Ciechanowiec is bordered by the gminas of Boguty-Pianki, Grodzisk, Jabłonna Lacka, Klukowo, Nur, Perlejewo, Rudka and Sterdyń.

References

External links 
Polish official population figures 2006
 Ciechanowiec Online

Ciechanowiec
Wysokie Mazowieckie County